The 1970 Wayne State Tartars football team represented Wayne State University as an independent during the 1970 NCAA College Division football season. In its sixth season under head coach Vernon Gale, the team compiled a 6–2 record.

Although classed did not begin until October 1, the team began training camp on September 3. Before the season began, the university began a review of the football program and its future. Coach Gale hinted at the time that 1970 may be his last as head football coach at Wayne.

The team's statistical leaders included Gary Rossi with 914 passing yards, Terry Fuller with 451 receiving yards, George Crayton with 206 rushing yards, Rossi set a school record with 35 pass attempts against Hillsdale on November 21. Tom Bomberski and Tom Sheppard were the team captains.

Schedule

References

Wayne State
Wayne State Warriors football seasons
Wayne State Tartars football